Dobson's epauletted fruit bat, or Dobson's fruit bat (Epomophorus dobsonii) is a species of megabat in the family Pteropodidae. It is found in Angola, Democratic Republic of the Congo, Malawi, Mozambique, Rwanda, Tanzania, and Zambia. Its natural habitat is dry savanna.

References

Epomophorus
Taxonomy articles created by Polbot
Bats of Africa
Mammals described in 1899
Taxa named by José Vicente Barbosa du Bocage
Taxobox binomials not recognized by IUCN